Ohridski Trubaduri - Ohrid Fest is a music festival that takes place in Ohrid, North Macedonia every summer. It began in 1994 as a showcase for Macedonian summer folklore. 

In 1997, a pop evening was introduced to motivate Macedonian lyricists and composers, as well as artists. In 2003, an international evening was added to the program, which consists of foreign artists performing their songs along with the best placed songs from the pop evening. The festival has become prominent within the Balkan region which led to its broadcast in different countries such as Bulgaria, Croatia, Montenegro, Serbia, and Greece. The winners of the festival are awarded with a monetary prize as well as promotional products from the sponsors. In 2008, a fourth night was added to the festival in which amateur or unrecognized singers would compete to qualify for the pop evening.

Winners

1994

Folk Evening
Jury - Zoran Georgiev - Kazi, Kazi Gino
Public - Neli Ti Rekov - Moj Galebe

1995

Folk Evening
Jury - Goran Kukic - Dali Ima Pile Shareno
Public - Lence Dedejska - Tecete Solzi

1996

Folk Evening
Jury - Marina Puharic & Korona - Vecna Biljana
Public - Bioritam - Eh, Da Mi Sviri Sadilo

1997

Folk Evening
Jury - Blagica Pavlovska - Eh, Ohride
Public - Blaga Peteska - Zaigraj Srce

Pop Evening
Jury - Tanja Carovska - Tvojot Baknez Me Progonuva
Public - Goce Arnaudov - Sudbino

1998

Folk Evening
Jury - Ibus Ibraimovski - Ribari Verni Drugari
Public - Petar Necovski - Ohrid Moj

Pop Evening
Jury - Saso Gigiv-Gis - Jana
Public - Saso Gigiv-Gis - Jana

1999

Folk Evening
Jury - Milica Kuzmanovska - Ajde Zapri Naume
Public - Petar Necovski - Verna Da Si

Pop Evening
Jury - Lidija Kocovska - Ne Znam Da Te Prebolam
Public - Aleks - Sakam Da Si Moja

2000

Folk Evening
Jury - Kirco Pop Lazarov - Bisero, Biser, Ohridski
Public - Frosina - Irina

Pop Evening
Jury - Kompas - Ti Si Mi
Public - Tanja Carovska - Zavrsen

2001

Folk Evening
Jury - Dusko Georgievski - Ilino Mome
Public - Tomislav Manić - Go Ljubam Ohrid =]

Pop Evening
Jury - Elena Petreska - Ne Gledaj Nazad
Public - Marjan Stojanovski - Srce Ke Ti Ukradam

2002

Folk Evening
Jury - Blagoja Grujoski - Sto Se Slucuva
Public - Zuica Lazova - Ne Me Prasuvaj

Pop Evening
Jury - Tvins - Me Zarobi
Public - Biba Dodeva - Jas I Mojot Bend

2003

Folk Evening
Jury - Marijana & Rosana - Ajde Sestro Da Zapeeme
Public - Orce Stefkovski - Igraj Mome Cocek Ti

Pop Evening
Jury - Martin Vucic - Kosa Od Zlato
Public - Martin Vucic - Kosa Od Zlato

International Evening
Jury - Sasa Matic - Mojot Grad (Bosnia & Herzegovina)
Public - Maja Grozdanovska Panceva - Nova Planeta (North Macedonia)

2004

Folk Evening
Jury - Kompas - Korab Izguben
Public - Petar Necovski - Ohrid Gradu Biseren

Pop Evening
Jury - Maja Vukicevic - Amajlija
Public - Marjan Stojanovski - Ima Nesto

International Evening
Jury - Goran Karan - Svetot E Luda Topka (Croatia)
Public - Bojan Marović - Ako Pak Se Vratiš (Serbia & Montenegro)

2005

Folk Evening
Jury - Nino Velickovski & Boemi - Krv Boemska
Public - Riste Naumovski - Vecen Ohrid

Pop Evening
Jury - Miki Jovanovski-Jafer - Nemirni Misli
Public - Goko Tanevski - Nemam Pravo

International Evening
Jury - Bojan Bjelić - To Nije Ljubav (Serbia & Montenegro)
Public - Bojan Bjelić - To Nije Ljubav (Serbia & Montenegro)

2006

Folk Evening
Jury - -
Public - -

Pop Evening
Jury - Elena Petreska - Galebe
Public - Elena Petreska - Galebe

International Evening
Jury - Vanja & Mika
Public - Jozefina (Croatia)

2007

Folk Evening
Jury - Elena Velevska - Nebo Od Vanila
Public - Milan Babić - Sega Koga Te Nema

Pop Evening
Jury - Elvir Mekić feat. Maja Sazdanovska - Opasno
Public - Adrian Gaxha - Sam Se Lažam

International Evening
Jury - Nikola Burovac & Tanja Žagar - Neka te, Neka te (Serbia/Slovenia) 
Public - Bojan Marović - Ničeg nema(Montenegro)

2008

Folk Evening
Jury - Snežana Savić - Sakam da sme zaedno (Serbia)
Public - Snežana Savić - Sakam da sme zaedno (Serbia)

Pop Evening
Jury - Igor Mitrovic - Nikogas poveke
Public - Dani - Nikoj kako ti

International Evening
Jury - Shpat Kasapi (Albania)
Public - Antonija Sola - Bozji Pat (Croatia)

2009

Folk Evening
Jury - Lidija Milosevic-Samanta - Eden den
Public - Aneta Molika - Imas druga

Pop Evening
Jury - Risto Samardziev & Vlatko Ilievski - Za ljubov se pee do kraj
Public - Risto Samardziev & Vlatko Ilievski - Za ljubov se pee do kraj

International Evening
Jury - Jacques Houdek - Opasna Zena (Croatia)
Public - Risto Samardziev & Vlatko Ilievski - Za ljubov se pee do kraj (North Macedonia)

References

External links
Ohrid Fest Official Website

Summer festivals
Ohrid
Annual events in North Macedonia
1994 establishments in the Republic of Macedonia
Pop music festivals
Folk festivals in North Macedonia
Music festivals established in 1994
Rock festivals in North Macedonia
Summer events in North Macedonia